Basudevpur is a Vidhan Sabha constituency of Bhadrak district, Odisha.

Area of this constituency includes Basudevpur, Basudevpur block and 7 GPs (Bhatapada, Saya, Bahabalpur, Sindol, Kolha, Mukundapur and Maharampur) of Tihidi block.

In 2009 election, Biju Janata Dal candidate Bijayshree Routray defeated Indian National Congress candidate Madhabananda Mallick Das by a margin of 6,840 votes. In 2019, Bishnubrata Routray of BJD won the election.

Elected Members

13 elections held during 1961 to 2014. Elected members from the Basudevpur constituency are:
2019: (41): Bishnubrata Routray (Biju Janata Dal)
2014: (41): Bijayshree Routray (Biju Janata Dal)
2009: (41): Bijayshree Routray (Biju Janata Dal) 
2004: (16): Bijayshree Routray (Biju Janata Dal) 
2000: (16): Bijayshree Routray (Biju Janata Dal)
1995: (16): Bijayshree Routray (Janata Dal)
1990: (16): Bijayshree Routray (Janata Dal)
1985: (16): Madhu Sadan Panigrahi (Indian National Congress)
1980: (16): Jagabandhu Das (Indian National Congress (I))
1977: (16): Nilamani Routray (Janata Party)
1974: (16): Jagabandhu Das (Indian National Congress)
1971: (17): Nilamani Routray (Utkal Congress)
1967: (17): Harekrushna Mahatab (Orissa Jana Congress)
1961: (125): Nilamani Routray (Indian National Congress)

2014 Election Result
In 2014 election, Biju Janata Dal candidate  Bijayshree Routray defeated Indian National Congress candidate Madhabananda Mallick by a margin of 6,506 votes.

Summary of results of the 2009 Election

Notes

References

Assembly constituencies of Odisha
Bhadrak district